René Redzepi (born 16 December 1977) is a Danish chef and co-owner of the three-Michelin star restaurant Noma in the Christianshavn neighborhood of Copenhagen, Denmark. His restaurant was voted the best restaurant in the world by Restaurant magazine's World's Best Restaurants in 2010, 2011, 2012, 2014 and 2021, and was awarded its third Michelin star in 2021. Redzepi is noted for his work on the reinvention and refinement of a new Nordic cuisine and food that is characterized by inventiveness and clean flavours.

Early life and education 
Redzepi was born in Copenhagen, Denmark, to an immigrant father from the Republic of Macedonia and a Danish mother. His father is of Albanian ethnic descent.

When he was young, Redzepi's family moved to Macedonia and lived in Tetovo, a predominantly ethnic Albanian area, until 1992 – the start of the Yugoslav Wars. Redzepi has said he found life in Macedonia very enjoyable compared to his later time in a small apartment in a not so-great neighborhood in Denmark. In Macedonia, Redzepi lived in a rural area in a large multi-generation house where they ate locally sourced food, mostly vegetarian, and very healthy.

After the family moved back to Denmark, Redzepi often spent his summers in Yugoslavia when he was young.

Redzepi has a twin brother, Kenneth Redzepi. He and his brother had multiple newspaper delivery services, working for a local store so that they could contribute to the family's income.

When he was 15 years old, Redzepi left high school. He enrolled in a cooking school with a friend.

Career 
After choosing a culinary career, Redzepi trained at a local family-owned Michelin starred restaurant called Pierre André in Copenhagen, where he had an apprenticeship that lasted four years. When he was 19 years old, he went to work at Le Jardin des Sens in Montpellier in Southern France.

Redzepi first visited El Bulli as a guest in 1998 and subsequently worked there during the 1999 season.

Back in Copenhagen, Redzepi started working at Kong Hans Kælder, which had been one of the city's leading gourmet restaurants since the mid-1970s. In 2001 he spent four months working under Thomas Keller at The French Laundry in California, but returned to Kong Hans Kælder and Copenhagen.

In December 2002, when he was 24 years old, Redzepi was contacted by Claus Meyer, who had been offered the opportunity to operate a restaurant at the North Atlantic House, a former 18th-century warehouse which was being turned into a cultural centre for the North Atlantic region. The restaurant, Noma, was opened in 2004 with Redzepi as the head chef.

Redzepi sources much of his food locally and does research by foraging for food in the wild. He said that this comes from his time living in Macedonia, where food was local and fresh. Much of the approach to the menu and food at Noma is based on seasonal themes of what is available at the time. Redzepi also focuses on fermentation and dehydration, experimenting with using as much of the plants, meat, and fish as possible.

Redzepi has, at times, served insects.

Personal life 
Redzepi is married to chef Nadine Levy Redzepi, who grew up in Portugal and Denmark. They have three daughters.

Awards and accolades 

 2006: The World's 50 Best Restaurants, Restaurant – 33rd Best Restaurant in the World
 2007: The World's 50 Best Restaurants, Restaurant – 15th Best Restaurant in the World
 2008: The World's 50 Best Restaurants, Restaurant – 10th Best Restaurant in the World
 2008: TripAdvisor, Best restaurant in the world
 2008: Lo Mejor de la Gastronomia conference (San Sebastián, Spain), International Chef of the Year
 2008–present: Michelin Guide – two stars
 2009: The World's 50 Best Restaurants, Restaurant – 3rd Best Restaurant in the World
 2009: The World's 50 Best Restaurants, Restaurant – Chefs' Choice
 2010: The World's 50 Best Restaurants, Restaurant – Best Restaurant in the World
 2011: The World's 50 Best Restaurants, Restaurant – Best Restaurant in the World
 2012: The World's 50 Best Restaurants, Restaurant – Best Restaurant in the World
 2012: TIMES 2012 100 Most Influential People in the World
 2013: The World's 50 Best Restaurants, Restaurant – 2nd Best Restaurant in the World
 2014: The World's 50 Best Restaurants, Restaurant – Best Restaurant in the World
 2015: The World's 50 Best Restaurants, Restaurant – 3rd Best Restaurant in the World
 2016: The Catey Awards International Outstanding Achievement
 2016: Bestowed Knight of The Order of the Dannebrog
 2016: The World's 50 Best Restaurants, Restaurant – 5th Best Restaurant in the World
 2019: The World's 50 Best Restaurants, Restaurant – 2nd Best Restaurant in the World
 2021: The World's 50 Best Restaurants, Restaurant – Best Restaurant in the World

Filmography 
 2008: The Great British Menu (TV series) – 1 episode: Heston Blumenthal's Dinner at the Gherkin
 2008: Noma: A Boiling Point / Noma pa Kogepunktet (TV documentary)
 2009: MasterChef (TV series) – 1 episode: #5.32
 2010: Three Stars (TV Movie documentary)
 2010: MasterChef: The Professionals (TV series) – 1 episode: #3.16
 2010: Noma at Boiling Point (TV Movie documentary)
 2012: Anthony Bourdain: No Reservations (TV series documentary) – 1 episode: Japan: Cook It Raw
 2012: The Mind of a Chef (TV series documentary) – 3 episodes: Rene, chef, Buddies
 2013: La última película (documentary)
 2014: Finding Gaston (documentary)
 2015: Noma: My Perfect Storm (documentary)
 2016: Ants on a Shrimp (documentary)
 2016: Noma: Australia (TV series documentary) – 3 episodes: #1.1, #1.2, #1.3
 2018: How to Dine at René Redzepi's new noma (Without a Reservation) (short)
 2018: Ugly Delicious (TV series documentary) – 3 episodes: Tacos, Homecooking, BBQ

Works and publication

Books

Journals

Documentaries

References

Further reading

External links 

 
 

Danish chefs
Danish restaurateurs
Danish cookbook writers
People from Copenhagen
1977 births
Living people
Head chefs of Michelin starred restaurants
Danish people of Albanian descent
Danish people of Macedonian descent
James Beard Foundation Award winners
Knights of the Order of the Dannebrog